Jagas are a social caste based group of people lower in the Hindu hierarchy who held the traditional job of genealogists of primarily Rajput. 
 families mainly in Rajasthan, India and surrounding states.They had  power and a matching responsibility for accuracy as their testimony in legal matters was  tenable in the courts. Jagas visited villages in their charge every two to three years to record the events and collect the customary fees in the form of cattle, elephants (from very rich patrons), grain  and money to which they were entitled.  Jagas have also been described as Bhats.

References

Social groups of Rajasthan
Rajput culture